The 1999 Limerick Senior Hurling Championship was the 105th staging of the Limerick Senior Hurling Championship since its establishment by the Limerick County Board.

Ahane were the defending champions.

On 3 October 1999, Ahane won the championship after a 0-14 to 2-05 defeat of Kilmallock in a final replay. It was their 18th championship title overall and their second title in succession.

Results

Final

References

Limerick Senior Hurling Championship
Limerick Senior Hurling Championship